The National Council of Churches Review is a journal of the National Council of Churches in India published from Nagpur 11 times a year.

References

Publications established in 1922
English-language journals
Academic journals associated with learned and professional societies of India
11 times per year journals